Defense Intelligence Agency (DIA) is the South Korea intelligence agency for military intelligence.

Activities
It runs the Cyber Defense Headquarters (사이버사령부) that investigates and prevents cyber-attacks from North Korea. The CDH was criticized for the lack of a designated headquarters.

References

South Korean military intelligence agencies
Government agencies established in 1981
1981 establishments in South Korea
Buildings and structures in Yongsan District
Ministry of National Defense (South Korea)